Ape Out is a beat 'em up game developed by Gabe Cuzzillo and published by Devolver Digital. The game was released for Microsoft Windows and Nintendo Switch on February 28, 2019.

Gameplay 
Ape Out is a single player beat 'em up video game played from a top-down perspective. The player controls a gorilla running through a maze while evading enemies in the form of gun-wielding humans. The human enemies are easily killed with a single attack and can also be grabbed and used as a shield; however, as they are armed with guns, they can quickly kill the player as well. The principal aim of the game is to escape each level and killing enemies is not technically required in order to proceed.

The maze design is randomized and is slightly different on each play, making it impossible to memorize the layout of a level.

One of the game's main themes is jazz music and each of the game's four chapters are represented as jazz albums with each level representing one track. The gameplay features a loud and chaotic, all-percussion jazz soundtrack composed by Matt Boch (associate arts professor at NYU Game Center) which reacts dynamically to the gameplay, for example by increasing in intensity as the player faces more enemies, crashing cymbals each time an enemy is killed and adjusting the volume according to one's speed and number of kills.

In order to provide a reactive and procedurally generated soundtrack for each playthrough, the game draws from a bank of thousands of recorded individual drum sounds, some recorded by Boch with others sourced externally, and combines them according to player movement. The system will also match the location of what is happening on screen to the drum or cymbal which matches that approximate location on a real drum kit. Each chapter of the game also features a different style of jazz percussion, with Boch describing the first chapter as the most quintessentially jazz, whereas other chapters feature more unusual instruments for jazz music. The end of the last chapter features the song "You've Got to Have Freedom" by Pharoah Sanders.

The game also features a minimalist art style which has been compared to that of Saul Bass.

Development 
Ape Out was developed by Gabe Cuzzillo using the Unity game engine. Ape Out was Cuzzillo's second game, after Foiled, which he developed with Aaron Taecker-Wyss and released in 2014. Development on Ape Out began when Cuzzillo entered into game development courses at New York University (NYU), where he also worked on an independent study with Bennett Foddy. Foddy contributed to Ape Out art, while Matt Boch, an associate professor for NYU's Game Center, worked on the game's music system and sound design. Ape Out was part of the NYU Game Center Incubator and partially financed by Indie Fund. Ape Out was a finalist for the 2016 Independent Games Festival's "Best Student Game" award but lost to Beglitched.

Publisher Devolver Digital announced their involvement in Ape Out in March 2017, when they released a playable trailer for the game and announced a projected release date of "summer 2017". The publisher announced in December 2018 that Ape Out would be released on February 7, 2019, for Microsoft Windows and Nintendo Switch. However, the game was delayed by three weeks and was released for both platforms on February 28, 2019.

Reception 

Ape Out received "generally favorable" reviews on both platforms, according to review aggregator website Metacritic. The PC version scores an 83 from 34 international critics on Metacritic, and a score of 84 from 31 international critics on the Nintendo Switch.

Awards 
The game was nominated for "Best Visual Design" and "Best Audio" at the 2019 Golden Joystick Awards, and for the Off Broadway Award for Best Indie Game at the New York Game Awards, and won the award for "Audio Achievement" at the 16th British Academy Games Awards, whereas its other nomination was for "Debut Game".

References

External links 
 

2019 video games
Beat 'em ups
Nintendo Switch games
Top-down video games
Video games about primates
Video games developed in the United States
Games financed by Indie Fund
Windows games
Single-player video games
Fictional gorillas
BAFTA winners (video games)